The Extraordinary and Plenipotentiary Ambassador of Peru to the Hellenic Republic of Greece is the official representative of the Republic of Peru to the Hellenic Republic.

As of 2023, the ambassador to Greece is also accredited to Albania and Bulgaria. The former was accredited from Yugoslavia until its dissolution, and the latter had an embassy in Sofia until 2003.

Both countries established relations in 1965, which have continued since. Peru opened an embassy in 1987, located in Athens.

List of representatives

See also
List of ambassadors of Peru to Italy
List of ambassadors of Peru to Yugoslavia

References

Greece
Peru